David Mayer Epstein (October 3, 1930 – January 15, 2002) was a composer, conductor, and music scientist who taught at the Massachusetts Institute of Technology.

He was the author of Shaping Time: Music, the Brain, and Performance, a work on the neurological basis for various elements of music theory, and co-editor of Beauty and the Brain: Biological Aspects of Aesthetics.

References

External links

 Obituary at MIT

American male conductors (music)
American male composers
Pupils of Roger Sessions
1931 births
2002 deaths
20th-century American composers
20th-century American conductors (music)
20th-century American male musicians